Ewald Ullmann (born 5 May 1943) is an Austrian retired footballer.

References

External links
 Rapid Archiv
 Sturm Archiv

1943 births
Living people
Austrian footballers
Austria international footballers
Association football midfielders
SK Rapid Wien players
FC Kärnten players